Mohamed Amine Aouamri (born February 18, 1983, in Algiers) is an Algerian footballer. He currently played for MC Oran in the Algerian Ligue Professionnelle 1.

Club career
On June 4, 2009, Aouamri signed a two-year contract with USM Alger. During his time with the club, he made 57 league appearances, scoring 5 goals.

On 18 July 2011, Aouamri signed a two-year contract with ASO Chlef, joining them on a free transfer.

References

External links
 DZFoot Profile
 

1983 births
Living people
Footballers from Algiers
Algerian footballers
Algerian Ligue Professionnelle 1 players
RC Kouba players
OMR El Annasser players
USM Alger players
ASO Chlef players
MC Oran players
Association football defenders
21st-century Algerian people